The 2021 Virginia Cavaliers football team represented the University of Virginia during the 2021 NCAA Division I FBS football season. The Cavaliers were led by sixth-year head coach Bronco Mendenhall and played their home games at Scott Stadium. The team competed as members of the Atlantic Coast Conference (ACC).

After finishing their regular season with a 6–6 record, the Cavaliers accepted a bid to play in the Fenway Bowl, where they were due to face the SMU Mustangs. On December 26, the Cavaliers withdrew from the game, due to COVID-19 issues; the bowl was subsequently canceled.

Schedule

Rankings

Coaching staff

Players drafted into the NFL

References

Virginia
Virginia Cavaliers football seasons
Virginia Cavaliers football